Hydrangea xanthoneura is a species of flowering plant in the family Hydrangeaceae, native to China.

References

External links
 Hydrangea xanthoneura at efloras.org.

xanthoneura
Flora of China